Sir Iain Thomas Livingstone,  (born 6 October 1966) is a Scottish police officer who is currently Chief Constable of Police Scotland. He was previously Deputy Chief Constable Designate of the force. He was named as the next Chief Constable on 15 August 2018 and took up office formally on 27 August 2018.

Early life
Livingstone graduated from the University of Aberdeen in 1988 with a first class Bachelor of Laws degree. During his time as a student at Aberdeen he played association football as a forward for Raith Rovers and Montrose. He also attended the University of Strathclyde before beginning a career as a solicitor.

Police career

Livingstone joined Lothian and Borders Police in 1992, rising swiftly through the ranks and eventually becoming head of that force's CID branch and Assistant Chief Constable for Crime. He graduated with a master's degree from the John Jay College of Criminal Justice at the City University of New York, where he studied from 1998 as a Fulbright scholar; he also served secondments as a special investigator with the Police Ombudsman for Northern Ireland, and was part of Lord Bonomy's review of corroboration. He has sat on the Scottish Sentencing Council. He advises on the Operation Kenova investigation into matters during The Troubles in Northern Ireland.

Livingstone served in detective and uniform roles in Edinburgh and West Lothian, leading a number of major investigations and operations. As Detective Superintendent, he played a key role in the security operation around the G8 meeting in 2005 and headed the murder investigation into the double shooting at the Marmion Bar in Edinburgh.

After completing the Strategic Command Course, he was appointed Assistant Chief Constable for Lothian and Borders Police in April 2009, with responsibility for Crime and Operations. As ACC, he was Gold commander for many significant events including the visit to Edinburgh of Pope Benedict XVI in 2010.

When Lothian & Borders was amalgamated into the new Police Scotland force in 2013, Livingstone was named Deputy Chief Constable for Crime and operations. After being overlooked for the Chief Constable job when Phil Gormley was appointed as the successor to Stephen House in late 2015, he initially remained part of the force executive but in summer 2017 announced his intention to retire in the coming months. He then accepted a request to reconsider his decision after several allegations of misconduct were made against Chief Constable Gormley and the latter was placed on special leave; by September 2017 Livingstone was leading the force on an interim basis. When Gormley resigned in February 2018 to contest the allegations, Livingstone became the frontrunner to succeed him formally. The role as Chief Constable from 27 August 2018 carries a four-year term and an annual salary of £216,000.

As Chief Constable, he has led the national Service during through the Covid pandemic; the security operation for the United Nation’s COP26 Summit in 2021; and Operation Unicorn following the death of Her Majesty Queen Elizabeth.

On February 23, 2023 he announced his retirement from Police Scotland and is due to leave post in the summer of 2023.

Controversies
He was suspended and demoted in 2003 after an allegation of sexual misconduct after an event at Tulliallan Policing College three years earlier, but was cleared following an internal misconduct hearing and later reinstated to his previous role as Superintendent (the youngest officer of that rank in Scotland at the time) following an appeal.

Livingstone admitting he had acted inappropriately by falling asleep in the woman's room, although he was cleared of any sexual misconduct. He told the BBC earlier that he had too much to drink at a social event at the college, and had fallen asleep "in the wrong place", adding: "That was wrong, I shouldn't have done that".

Former Tayside Police assistant chief constable Angela Wilson, commenting on Livingstone being cleared of sexual assault allegations, said that "[Livingstone was] not fit to lead". Constable Calum Steele, Scotland's police union boss, was found guilty of posting "inappropriate and offensive" online comments about Wilson following her comments on Livingstone.

Honours
Livingstone was awarded the Queen's Police Medal in 2015 for distinguished service. He was knighted in the 2022 Birthday Honours for services to policing and the public.

References

British Chief Constables
Scottish recipients of the Queen's Police Medal
Living people
1966 births
Lothian and Borders Police officers
Police Scotland officers
People from Dunfermline
Footballers from Fife
Scottish footballers
Scottish Football League players
Raith Rovers F.C. players
Montrose F.C. players
Alumni of the University of Aberdeen
Alumni of the University of Strathclyde
Scottish lawyers
Scottish police officers
Association football wingers
Knights Bachelor